The Eastern Cordillera Real montane forests (NT0121) is an ecoregion in the eastern range of the Andes of southern Colombia, Ecuador and northern Peru.
The ecoregion covers the eastern slopes of the Andes, and includes montane forest that rises from the Amazonian rain forest, with cloud forest and elfin forest at higher elevations.
It is rich in species, including many endemics.
It is threatened by logging and conversion for pasturage and subsistence agriculture.

Geography

Location
The ecoregion is on the eastern slopes of the central Andes.
They extend along the southern part of the Cordillera Oriental of Colombia, the eastern part of the Cordillera Real of Ecuador and the northern part of the Andes of Peru.

In the extreme north the ecoregion transitions into the Magdalena Valley montane forests and Cordillera Oriental montane forests ecoregions.
The north and central parts of the ecoregion merge into the Napo moist forests to the east and the Northwestern Andean montane forests to the west.
The southern part transitions into the Ucayali moist forests to the east, Marañón dry forests to the south and Tumbes–Piura dry forests to the west.
The north and central parts of the ecoregion adjoin or surround regions of Northern Andean páramo at the upper levels, and the southern part surrounds regions of Cordillera Central páramo.

Terrain

In Peru part of the ecoregion extends west to the Pacific slope.
The mountains south of the Huancabamba Depression were mostly formed in the Miocene (23–5.3 Ma) while the mountains to the north formed between the end of the Pliocene (5.3–2.6 Ma) and the Pleistocene (2.6 Ma to 11,700 years ago).

The Pacific slope forests in Peru have a dry, seasonal climate and are mostly small patches of woods with relatively few species, but several endemic species.

Climate

At a sample location at coordinates  the Köppen climate classification is Aw (equatorial; winter dry).

Ecology

The ecoregion is in the neotropical realm, in the tropical and subtropical moist broadleaf forests biome.
The ecoregion is part of the Northern Andean Montane Forests global ecoregion, which includes the Magdalena Valley montane forests, Venezuelan Andes montane forests, Northwestern Andean montane forests, Cauca Valley montane forests, Cordillera Oriental montane forests, Santa Marta montane forests and Eastern Cordillera real montane forests terrestrial ecoregions.
The Huancabamba Depression allows movement of species between the Pacific lowlands and the Amazon region, and has great influence on the ecoregion's flora and fauna, which have elements from the Amazon rainforest, the Inter-Andean dry forests and the hills of southern Ecuador.
The ecoregion affects migration of species and formation of species, and has marked local endemism, notably in the Cajamarca Region of Peru.

Flora

Vegetation consists of evergreen broadleaf forest, with the composition varying considerably depending on elevation.
In the lower areas (ceja de montaña) the forests is closed and exuberant.
Higher up the trees are lower, and transition into cloud forest and then into elfin woodland.
There are various species specialized to a given altitude, some of which are endemic due to physical barriers to mobility.
The montane forests may once have held 30,000 to 40,000 species of flora, more than are found in the Amazon basin.

Fauna

Mammal species include Venezuelan red howler (Alouatta seniculus), white-fronted capuchin (Cebus albifrons), yellow-tailed woolly monkey (Oreonax flavicauda), spectacled bear (Tremarctos ornatus), taruca (Hippocamelus antisensis), guanaco (Lama guanicoe), kinkajou (Potos flavus) and perhaps mountain tapir (Tapirus pinchaque).
A 1982 study of bats showed that 37% of the species found on the western slopes were endemic.
Endangered mammals include equatorial dog-faced bat (Molossops aequatorianus), giant otter (Pteronura brasiliensis), mountain tapir (Tapirus pinchaque) and white-bellied spider monkey (Ateles belzebuth).

Bird species include masked mountain tanager (Buthraupis wetmorei), chestnut-bellied cotinga (Doliornis remseni), cinnamon screech owl (Megascops petersoni), neblina metaltail (Metallura odomae) and Andean condor (Vultur gryphus).
Endangered and endemic birds include white-breasted parakeet (Pyrrhura albipectus), coppery-chested jacamar (Galbula pastazae), and bicolored antvireo (Dysithamnus occidentalis).
Other endangered birds include royal sunangel (Heliangelus regalis) and black-and-chestnut eagle (Spizaetus isidori).

Endangered reptiles include Catamayo Coral Snake (Micrurus catamayensis), Lojan lancehead (Bothrops lojanus), Parker's Pholiodobolus (Macropholidus annectens), Parker's Ground Snake (Atractus carrioni), Riama balneator and Riama petrorum.
Endangered amphibians include:

 Kingsbury's rocket frog (Allobates kingsburyi)
 Azuay stubfoot toad (Atelopus bomolochos)
 Boulenger's stubfoot toad (Atelopus boulengeri)
 Morona-Santiago stubfoot toad (Atelopus halihelos)
 Gualecenita stubfoot toad (Atelopus nepiozomus)
 Schmidt's stubfoot toad (Atelopus pachydermus)
 Flat-spined Atelopus (Atelopus planispina)
 Amazon giant glass frog (Centrolene pipilatum)
 Phantasmal poison frog (Epipedobates tricolor)
 Napo giant glass frog (Espadarana audax)
 Marañón poison frog (Excidobates mysteriosus)
 North shore marsupial frog (Gastrotheca espeletia)
 Papallacta marsupial frog (Gastrotheca orophylax)
 Ridge marsupial frog (Gastrotheca psychrophila)
 Andean marsupial tree frog (Gastrotheca riobambae)
 Rio Chingual Valley tree frog (Hyloscirtus pantostictus)
 Papallacta tree frog (Hyloscirtus psarolaimus)
 Jondachi tree frog (Hyloscirtus staufferorum)
 South American rocket frog (Hyloxalus anthracinus)
 Palanda rocket frog (Hyloxalus cevallosi)
 Loja rocket frog (Hyloxalus elachyhistus)
 Carchi Andes frog (Hypodactylus brunneus)
 Cuyuja robber frog (Hypodactylus elassodiscus)
 Parker's Andes Frog (Lynchius parkeri)
 Napo Cochran frog (Nymphargus anomalus)
 Santa Rosa Cochran frog (Nymphargus megacheirus)
 Puyo giant glass frog (Nymphargus puyoensis)
 Napo plump toad (Osornophryne antisana)
 Guacamayo plump toad (Osornophryne guacamayo)
 Agua Rica leaf frog (Phyllomedusa ecuatoriana
 Papallacta robber frog (Pristimantis acerus)
 Santiago robber frog (Pristimantis atratus)
 Crest robber frog (Pristimantis balionotus)
 Rio Reventador robber frog (Pristimantis cremnobates)
 Cryptic robber frog (Pristimantis cryptomelas)
 De Ville's robber frog (Pristimantis devillei)
 Festa shy robber frog Pristimantis festae
 Papallacta Valley robber frog (Pristimantis gladiator)
 Ecuador robber frog (Pristimantis glandulosus)
 Fire robber frog (Pristimantis ignicolor)
 Rio Azuela robber frog (Pristimantis incanus)
 El cutín del Puyo (Pristimantis katoptroides)
 Pristimantis lividus
Urdaneta robber frog (Pristimantis orestes)
 Pristimantis pastazensis
 Zamora robber frog (Pristimantis percultus)
 Hidden robber frog (Pristimantis prolatus)
Sapote Robber Frog (Pristimantis proserpens) 
 Pristimantis pycnodermis
Canchaque Robber Frog (Pristimantis rhodoplichus) 
Trench robber frog (Pristimantis rubicundus) 
Mountain crest robber frog (Pristimantis vidua) 
Loja water frog (Telmatobius cirrhacelis) 
Piura water frog (Telmatobius ignavus) 
Vellard's water frog (Telmatobius vellardi)

Status
The World Wide Fund for Nature (WWF) gives the region the status of "Vulnerable".
The forest are fairly accessible, and are increasingly threatened by logging of commercially valuable Podocarpus and Prumnopitys species.
Large areas of the original forest have been cleared for pasturage or subsistence agriculture, or replaced by thickets.
Protected areas include the Cayambe Coca Ecological Reserve, Podocarpus National Park and Noroeste Biosphere Reserve.

Notes

Sources

Neotropical tropical and subtropical moist broadleaf forests
Ecoregions of Colombia
Ecoregions of Ecuador
Ecoregions of Peru
Andean forests
Montane forests